Reptilian humanoids are fictional organisms of varied species in folklore, science fiction, fantasy, and conspiracy theories.

Mythology
 Boreas (Aquilon to the Romans): the Greek god of the cold north wind, described by Pausanias as a winged man, sometimes with serpents instead of feet.
 Cecrops I: the mythical first King of Athens was half man, half snake.
 Chaac: the Maya civilization rain god, depicted in iconography with a human body showing reptilian or amphibian scales, and with a non-human head evincing fangs and a long, pendulous nose.
 Dragon Kings: creatures from Chinese mythology sometimes depicted as reptilian humanoids.
 Some djinn in Islamic mythology are described as alternating between human and serpentine forms.
 Echidna, the wife of Typhon in Greek mythology, was half woman, half snake.
 Fu Xi: serpentine founding figure from Chinese mythology.
 Glycon: a snake god who had the head of a man.
 The Gorgons: Sisters in Greek mythology who had serpents for hair.
 The Lamia: a child-devouring female demon from Greek mythology depicted as half woman, half serpent.
 Nāga (Devanagari: नाग): reptilian beings (king cobras) from Hindu mythology said to live underground and interact with human beings on the surface.
 Nüwa: serpentine founding figure from Chinese mythology.
 Shenlong: a Chinese dragon thunder god, depicted with a human head and a dragon's body.
 Serpent: an entity from the Genesis creation narrative occasionally depicted with legs, and sometimes identified with Satan, though its representations have been both male and female.
 Sobek: Ancient Egyptian crocodile-headed god.
 Suppon No Yurei: A turtle-headed human ghost from Japanese mythology and folklore.
 Tlaloc: Aztec god depicted as a man with snake fangs.
 Typhon, the "father of all monsters" in Greek mythology, had a hundred snake-heads in Hesiod, or else was a man from the waist up, and a mass of seething vipers from the waist down.
 Wadjet pre-dynastic snake goddess of Lower Egypt - sometimes depicted as half snake, half woman.
 Zahhak, a figure from Zoroastrian mythology who, in Ferdowsi's epic Shahnameh, grows a serpent on either shoulder.

Folklore
 Enchanted Moura from Portuguese and Galician folklore appears as a snake with long blonde hair.
 Kappa: Turtle-like humanoids from Japanese mythology and folklore.
 The Lizard Man of Scape Ore Swamp in South Carolina, United States
 The Loveland Frog (or Loveland Lizard), in Loveland, Ohio, United States
 The Thetis Lake monster in Canada
 The White Snake: a figure from Chinese folklore
 Cuca, an alligator humanoid witch from Brazilian folklore.

Fringe theories
 Reptilians appear in some claims of alien encounters and in the conspiracy theories of David Icke

Scientific speculation
 The dinosauroid, a hypothetical reptilian humanoid conjectured by palaeontologist Dale Russell.
 Other speculated sapient dinosaurs

Modern fiction
A wide range of fictional works depict reptilian humanoids.

Literature
 Dracs from the Enemy Mine series by Barry B. Longyear.
 Evra Von from Darren Shan's "Saga of Darren Shan"
 The Horibs from the Pellucidar books
 The Barabels from Star Wars
 Hork-Bajir from K. A. Applegate's Animorphs
 The Lady of the Green Kirtle from CS Lewis's The Silver Chair
 An unnamed race from H.P. Lovecraft's The Nameless City - later Cthulhu Mythos tales have named these the Valusians or simply "serpent people".
 The Race from Harry Turtledove's Worldwar series
 Serpent Men from the works of Robert E. Howard (also in the Marvel universe)
 Yig, the serpent god from H.P. Lovecraft's Cthulhu Mythos.
 Yilané from the novel West of Eden by Harry Harrison
 The Creeps and the Snake Lady from the Goosebumps franchise.
 The Troglodytes from The Trials of Apollo

Television

Doctor Who
 Draconians
 Foamasi
 Homo reptilia
 Silurians
 Sea Devils
 Ice Warriors

Star Trek
 Cardassians
 Gorn
 Jem'Hadar
 Voth
 Tosk
 Xindi-Reptilians

Ninjago
 Serpentine
 Vermillion

Other
 Cobra-La, and Cobra Commander from the G.I. Joe series
 Chase Young from Xiaolin Showdown
 The Culebra from From Dusk till Dawn: The Series
 Drakh and Narn from Babylon 5
 Lizard Man from He-Man and the Masters of the Universe
 Lizardman Phantom from Kamen Rider Wizard
 The Lizardmen from Sir Arthur Conan Doyle's The Lost World
 Lizardo from The Ambiguously Gay Duo segment of TV Funhouse
 Scarrans from Farscape
 Sleestaks from Land of the Lost
 Slithe and his fellow Lizards from ThunderCats
 The Snake Men from Masters of the Universe
 The Snake People from the TV-movie The Archer: Fugitive from the Empire
 Spinner from My Hero Academia
 Unas from Stargate
 Visitors from V
 Zafiro from Disney's Gargoyles has a red-skinned snake-bodied gargate, with two humanoid arms and feathered wings, reminiscent of Kukulcan in Mayan myth and leader of his gargoyle clan

Comics

Marvel
 Badoon, another hostile alien race
 Chitauri, alien shapeshifters from the Ultimate Marvel universe. 
 Lizard, an enemy of Spider-Man
 The Lizard Men of Subterranea
 The Lizard Men of the Savage Land
 The Lizard Men of Tok from the Microverse
 Sauron, a Pteranodon-like enemy of the X-Men
 Skrulls, an alien race of reptilian shapeshifters
 Slither, a snake-like mutant and ally of Magneto who has been a member of the Resistants and the Serpent Society
 Stegron, a Stegosaurus-like enemy of Spider-Man
 Zn'rx (Snarks), reptilian aliens bipeds encountered by the Power Pack

DC
 Copperhead, some versions
 Gordanians, a species of alien reptilian slavers
 Killer Croc, an enemy of Batman
 The Lizardmen from the Warlord series. 
 Llarans
 Psions

Other
 Dinosaurs for Hire, dinosaur-like alien mercenaries
 Henry Phage from the Mr. Hero comics from Tekno Comix
 Kleggs, alien mercenaries in the Judge Dredd universe.
 The Teenage Mutant Ninja Turtles, Slash, Leatherhead, and even the Triceratons.
 Treens from Dan Dare
 Tyranny Rex, a reptilian artist in stories published in 2000AD.
 Zarbon from anime and manga Dragon Ball Z.

Film
 Dracs from Enemy Mine
 Thulsa Doom from Conan the Barbarian
 Trandoshans from Star Wars
 Lectroids from Buckaroo Banzai
 Draco from Above Majestic

Games

Roleplaying and strategy games
 Argonians, a race in The Elder Scrolls series
 Bangaa, a race in the game series of Final Fantasy
 Drell, a race in the Mass Effect series
 Dinaurians from Fossil Fighters and Fossil Fighters: Champions
 Iksar, a race from the EverQuest franchise.
 Lizalfos from the Legend of Zelda series.
 Lizardmen from the Warhammer fantasy tabletop games.
 Naga from the Warcraft series. 
 Reptites from Chrono Trigger
 Saurians from  Risen
 Susie from  Deltarune

Dungeons & Dragons
 Kobolds
 Lizardfolk
 Saurial 
 Troglodytes
 Yuan-ti

Platform and fighting games
 Bowser and the Koopas from Super Mario Bros.
 Espio the Chameleon and Vector the Crocodile from Sonic the Hedgehog
 Lizardman, a character from the Soul series of fighting games
 Locust Horde, the primary antagonists in the game franchise Gears of War
 King K. Rool and most Kremlings from Donkey Kong
 Reptile, Chameleon, and Khameleon from the video game series Mortal Kombat
 Riptor, a character from the fighting game Killer Instinct

See also
 List of avian humanoids
 List of piscine and amphibian humanoids
 List of dragons in literature

References

 
 
-
Legendary reptiles
Lists of fictional humanoid species
humanoids